The 1888 Staten Island Cricket Club football team was an American football team that represented the Staten Island Cricket Club in the American Football Union (AFU) during the 1888 college football season. The Staten Island team played its home games in Staten Island, New York, and compiled a 3–3–1 record (3–2–1 against AFU opponents).

The team was captained by Harry Beecher, a star quarterback and captain of the Yale Bulldogs in 1887, and a major proponent of their championship in the same year.

Schedule

Second team schedule

References

Staten Island Cricket Club
Staten Island Cricket Club football seasons
College football winless seasons
Staten Island Cricket Club football